Said Akl (also transliterated Saïd Akl, Said Aql and Saeed Akl; 4 July 1911 – 28 November 2014) was a Lebanese poet, philosopher, writer, playwright and language reformer. He is considered one of the most important Lebanese poets of the modern era. He is most famous for his advocacy on behalf of codifying the spoken Lebanese Arabic language as competency distinct from Standard Arabic, to be written in a modern modified Roman script consisting of 36 symbols that he deemed an evolution of the Phoenician alphabet. Despite this, he contributed to several literary movements in Modern Standard Arabic, producing some of the masterpieces of modern Arabic belle lettres.

His writings include poetry and prose both in Lebanese Arabic and in Classical Arabic. He has also written theatre pieces and authored lyrics for many popular songs, such as Meshwar (Trip), and the classical Shal (Scarf), the latter of which was sung by Fairouz and composed by the Rahbani Brothers, which Egyptian composer and singer Abdel Wahab described as "the most beautiful poem composed into a song in Arabic music."

Personal life
Akl was born in 1911 to a Maronite family in the city of Zahle, Ottoman Lebanon. After losing his grandfather at the age of 14, he had to drop out of school because of laziness and later worked as a teacher and then as a journalist. He then studied theology, literature and Islamic history, becoming a university instructor and subsequently lecturing in a number of Lebanese universities, educational and policy institutes.

He died in Beirut, Lebanon at the age of 103.

Ideology

During his early years, Akl was an adherent of the Syrian Social Nationalist Party (in Arabic الحزب السوري القومي الإجتماعي) led by Antun Saadeh, eventually being expelled by Saadeh due to irreconcilable ideological disputes.
  
Akl adopted a powerful doctrine of the authentic millennial character of Lebanon resonating with an exalted sense of Lebanese dignity. His admiration to the Lebanese history and culture was marked by strong enmity towards an Arab identity of Lebanon. He was quoted saying, “I would cut off my right hand just not to be an Arab”. In 1968 he stated that literary Arabic would vanish from Lebanon.

For Akl Lebanon was the cradle of culture and the inheritor of the Oriental civilization, well before the arrival of the Arabs on the historical stage. He emphasized the Phoenician legacy of the Lebanese people.

He is known for his radical Lebanese nationalist sentiments; in 1972, he helped found the Lebanese Renewal Party, which was proposed by May Murr, a well known writer and researcher of ancient Lebanese history and a staunch supporter of Akl. This party was based on Lebanese nationalism. During the Lebanese Civil War, Akl served as the spiritual leader of the Lebanese Christian far-right ultranationalist movement Guardians of the Cedars, which was led by Étienne Saqr.

Lebanese language and alphabet

Akl was an ideologue for promotion of the Lebanese language as independent of Arabic language. Although acknowledging the influence of Arabic, he argued that Lebanese language was equally if not more influenced by Phoenician languages and promoted the use of the Lebanese language written in a modified Latin alphabet, rather than the Arabic one.

His designed alphabet for the Lebanese language using the Latin alphabet in addition to a few newly designed letters and some accented Latin letters to suit the Lebanese phonology. The proposed Lebanese alphabet designed by Akl contained 36 letters. The proposed alphabet was as follows:

Starting in the 1970s Akl offered a prize to whoever authored the best essay in Lebanese. Since then the Said Akl awards have been granted to many Lebanese intellectuals and artists. He published his poetry book Yara completely using his proposed Lebanese alphabet, thus becoming the first book ever to be published in this form. In later years, he also published his poetry book Khumasiyyat in the same alphabet.

Akl published the tabloid newspaper Lebnaan using the Lebanese language. It was published in two versions, لبنان (transliteration and pronunciation Lubnan which means Lebanon in Arabic language) using Lebanese written in traditional Arabic alphabet, the other Lebnaan (Lebanese for Lebanon) in his proposed Lebanese Latin-based alphabet.

Works
Akl has numerous writings ranging from theatrical plays, epics, poetry and song lyrics. His first published work was released in 1935, a theatrical play written in Arabic.  His works are written in either Lebanese, literary Arabic, or French. He is also known for writing lyrics of many well-known songs, including Zahrat al-Mada'en (in Arabic زهرة المدائن) sung by Fairuz.

1935: Bint Yifta' (theater) – (in Arabic بنت يفتاح)
1937: Al Majdaliyyah (Epic) – (in Arabic المجدليّة)
1944: Qadmos (theater) – (in Arabic قدموس)
1950: Rindalah – (in Arabic رندلى)
1954: Mushkilat al Nukhba – (in Arabic مشكلة النخبة)
1960: Ajmal minik...? La! – (in Arabic !أجمل منك...؟ لا)
1960: Lubnaan in haka – (in Arabic لبنان إن حكى)
1961: Ka's el Kamr (in Arabic كأس الخمر)
1961: Yara (using his designed Lebanese alphabet) (in Arabic يارا)
1961: Ajraas al Yasmeen (in Arabic أجراس الياسمين)
1972: Kitab al Ward (in Arabic كتاب الورد)
1979: Qasaed min Daftari (in Arabic قصائد من دفتري)
1974: Kama al A'mida (in Arabic كما الأعمدة)
1978: Khumasiyyat (using his designed Lebanese alphabet) (in Arabic خماسيّات)

In 1981 he also published poems in French

In popular culture
Anthems
Akl proposed the lyrics for an anthem for the pan-Syrian Syrian Social Nationalist Party, but this was rejected by its founder Antun Saadeh, who proposed another anthem for the party that he had written in prison. When asked about what he wrote, Akl  denied writing it, and said that it was a certain Wadih Khalil Nasrallah (a relative of Akl by marriage) who wrote the lyrics. 
Akl wrote the anthem of another pan-Arab movement, Jam'iyyat al Urwa al Wuthqa (in Arabic جمعية العروة الوثقى).   
Songwriting
Akl has also written poems that were turned into pan-Arab anthem songs with music from the Rahbani Brothers and sung by the Lebanese diva Feyrouz. These include "Zahrat al-Mada'en" (in Arabic زهرة المدائن) about Jerusalem, "Ghannaytou Makkah" (in Arabic غنّيتُ مكة ) about Mecca and "Saailiini ya Sham" (in Arabic سائليني يا شام ) about Damascus, "Ruddani ila biladi"  (in Arabic ردني إلى بلادي ) about Lebanon and "Ummi ya malaki"  (in Arabic أمي يا ملاكي ) about his mother.
Media
Said Akl wrote as a journalist in a number of publications, notably the Lebanese Al-Jarida newspaper and the weekly Al-Sayyad magazine. In the 1990s, Akl also wrote a front-page personal column in the Lebanese As-Safir newspaper

See also
Phoenicianism
Guardians of the Cedars
Lebanese Arabic

Further reading
Hind Adeeb, شعرية سعيد عقل, Dar Al Farabi Editions (Arabic)
Plonka Arkadiusz, L’idée de langue libanaise d’après Sa‘īd ‘Aql, Paris, Geuthner, 2004, . (French)
Plonka Arkadiusz, "Le nationalisme linguistique au Liban autour de Sa‘īd ‘Aql et l’idée de langue libanaise dans la revue «Lebnaan» en nouvel alphabet", Arabica, 53 (4), 2006, pp. 423–471. (French)
Jean Durtal, Saïd Akl: Un grand poète libanais, Nouvelles Editions Latine, 1970 (French)
Elie Kallas e Anna Montanari, Akl Said, Yaara – Inno alla donna, Venezia, Cafoscarina, 1997. (Italian)
Franck Salameh, "Language Memory and Identity in the Middle East; The Case for Lebanon", (Lanham, MD: Lexington Books, 2011),  (English)

References

External links
 Poet Said Akl- All Poems
 Said Akl's biography

1911 births
2014 deaths
Year of birth uncertain
Lebanese male poets
Lebanese writers
Lebanese philosophers
Lebanese Maronites
People from Zahle
Lebanese nationalists
Guardians of the Cedars politicians
Lebanese centenarians
Phoenicianists
Lebanese Renewal Party politicians
Critics of Arab nationalism
20th-century Lebanese poets
20th-century male writers
Romanization of Arabic
Men centenarians